"The Man on the Threshold" (original Spanish title "El Hombre en el Umbral") is a short story by Argentine writer Jorge Luis Borges. It was published in La Nación in April 1952 and added to 1952 edition of short story collection Aleph.

Plot summary
A new governor, a Scotsman named Glencairn, is sent to a certain Muslim city in British India to restore order. He succeeds in that using violent measures, but after few years, mysteriously disappears.  The narrator is assigned to find Glencairn. He goes to a certain address where a Muslim ceremony was being held. An old man on the threshold tells the narrator a story of a tyrant who was kidnapped and put to trial: he was judged by a madman and his verdict was death - this was in fact what happened to Glencairn, as the narrator discovers when he finds Glencairn's mutilated body.

Short stories by Jorge Luis Borges
1952 short stories